Oldhall Green is a hamlet in Suffolk, England. It is part of the civil parish of Cockfield and is located on the A1141 road between Lavenham and Bury St Edmunds. The Old Hall Green Farm was owned by Richard Hilder.

References

Hamlets in Suffolk
Cockfield, Suffolk